The women's 3000 m speed skating competition at the 2006 Winter Olympics in Turin, Italy, was held on 12 February, the second day of competition at the Olympics.

Records
Prior to this competition, the existing world and Olympic records were as follows.

No new world or Olympic records were set during this competition.

Results

Lap times

Lap times in brackets

  Ireen Wüst, Netherlands, (19.52 – 30.29 – 30.86 – 31.43 – 31.39 – 32.12 – 32.75 – 34.07) 4:02.43 
  Renate Groenewold, Netherlands, (19.64 – 30.27 – 30.92 – 31.54 – 31.39 – 32.17 – 33.29 – 34.26) 4:03.48 (+1.05)
  Cindy Klassen, Canada, (19.19 – 30.02 – 31.12 – 31.54 – 31.71 – 32.07 – 33.18 – 35.54) 4:04.37 (+1.94)
  Anni Friesinger, Germany, (19.47 – 31.26 – 31.27 – 31.63 – 32.05 – 32.12 – 32.87 – 33.92) 4:04.59 (+2.16)
  Claudia Pechstein, Germany, (19.53 – 30.68 – 31.47 – 31.87 – 32.29 – 32.80 – 33.02 – 33.88) 4:05.54 (+3.11)
  Daniela Anschütz-Thoms, Germany, (19.68 – 31.35 – 31.77 – 32.23 – 32.30 – 32.65 – 33.26 – 33.65) 4:06.89 (+4.46)
  Martina Sáblíková, Czech Republic, (20.51 – 31.96 – 32.44 – 32.33 – 32.29 – 32.76 – 33.23 – 32.90) 4:08.42 (+5.99)
  Kristina Groves, Canada, (20.15 – 31.05 – 31.72 – 31.95 – 32.59 – 32.81 – 33.78 – 34.98) 4:09.03 (+6.60)
  Clara Hughes, Canada, (21.05 – 32.41 – 32.46 – 32.48 – 32.86 – 32.72 – 32.66 – 32.53) 4:09.17 (+6.74)
  Katarzyna Wójcicka, Poland, (20.27 – 32.18 – 32.58 – 32.80 – 32.52 – 33.05 – 33.25 – 32.96) 4:09.61 (+7.18)
  Catherine Raney, United States, (20.39 – 31.96 – 32.18 – 32.47 – 32.48 – 32.80 – 33.53 – 34.63) 4:10.44 (+8.01)
  Wang Fei, China, (20.13 – 31.95 – 32.20 – 32.38 – 33.13 – 33.14 – 33.71 – 33.91) 4:10.55 (+8.12)
  Eriko Ishino, Japan, (19.92 – 30.89 – 31.54 – 32.36 – 33.15 – 33.90 – 34.38 – 35.07) 4:11.21 (+8.78)
  Maki Tabata, Japan, (19.94 – 31.38 – 31.99 – 32.60 – 33.21 – 33.84 – 34.44 – 34.98) 4:12.38 (+9.95)
  Maren Haugli, Norway, (20.60 – 32.49 – 32.59 – 32.62 – 32.97 – 33.22 – 33.65 – 34.36) 4:12.50 (+10.07)
  Anna Rokita, Austria, (20.27 – 31.55 – 32.24 – 32.85 – 33.28 – 33.61 – 34.12 – 34.95) 4:12.87 (+10.44)
  Moniek Kleinsman, Netherlands, (20.01 – 30.83 – 31.56 – 32.32 – 33.39 – 33.86 – 35.30 – 36.54) 4:13.81 (+11.38)
  Svetlana Vysokova, Russia, (20.56 – 32.58 – 33.35 – 33.26 – 33.32 – 33.35 – 33.51 – 34.01) 4:13.94 (+11.51)
  Noh Seon-yeong, Korea, (20.86 – 31.74 – 32.82 – 33.32 – 33.52 – 33.89 – 34.53 – 35.00) 4:15.68 (+13.25)
  Adelia Marra, Italy, (20.34 – 32.36 – 32.68 – 33.21 – 33.67 – 34.10 – 34.61 – 35.30) 4:16.27 (+13.84)
  Eriko Seo, Japan, (20.54 – 32.14 – 32.73 – 33.10 – 33.66 – 34.11 – 34.97 – 35.02) 4:16.27 (+13.84)
  Margaret Crowley, United States, (20.80 – 32.67 – 32.90 – 33.57 – 33.69 – 33.92 – 34.68 – 35.14) 4:17.37 (+14.94)
  Annette Bjelkevik, Norway, (20.48 – 32.07 – 32.89 – 32.58 – 33.63 – 34.41 – 35.22 – 36.29) 4:17.57 (+15.14)
  Valentina Yakshina, Russia, (20.70 – 33.10 – 33.19 – 32.99 – 33.66 – 34.61 – 35.14 – 36.04) 4:19.43 (+17.00)
  Ji Jia, China, (20.80 – 32.46 – 33.42 – 33.67 – 34.13 – 34.94 – 35.58 – 36.06) 4:21.06 (+18.63)
  Daniela Oltean, Romania, (20.62 – 32.97 – 33.30 – 34.21 – 34.80 – 35.26 – 35.82 – 36.36) 4:23.34 (+20.91)
  Kristine Holzer, United States, (21.56 – 33.21 – 33.60 – 34.54 – 35.07 – 35.73 – 36.25 – 36.64) 4:26.60 (+24.17)
  Nataliya Rybakova, Kazakhstan, (21.62 – 33.55 – 34.82 – 36.38 – 37.37 – 38.14 – 38.28 – 38.60) 4:38.76 (+36.33)

Pair order

Skater in inner lane on first lap listed first

 Natalya Rybakova, KAZ – Valentina Yakshina, RUS
 Daniela Oltean, ROM – Noh Seon-yeong, KOR
 Eriko Ishino, JPN – Moniek Kleinsman, NED
 Adelia Marra, ITA – Kristine Holzer, USA
 Eriko Seo, JPN – Jia Ji, CHN
 Katarzyna Wójcicka, POL – Annette Bjelkevik, NOR
 Maki Tabata, JPN – Svetlana Vysokova, RUS
 Margaret Crowley, USA – Maren Haugli, NOR
 Catherine Raney, USA – Wang Fei, CHN
 Anna Rokita, AUT – Ireen Wüst, NED
 Daniela Anschütz-Thoms, GER – Claudia Pechstein, GER
 Renate Groenewold, NED – Cindy Klassen, CAN
 Anni Friesinger, GER – Kristina Groves, CAN
 Clara Hughes, CAN – Martina Sáblíková, CZE

References

External links
 Women's 3000m - Final - Detailed results, from NBCOlympics.com, retrieved 13 February 2006

Women's speed skating at the 2006 Winter Olympics